John Nicholson Bell (born 14 January 1947) is a former English lawn and indoor bowler,  commentator and World Bowls President.

Bowls career

World Championships
Bell won his first gold medal as part of the England team that won the team event (Leonard Cup) at the 1980 World Outdoor Bowls Championship in Melbourne. Four years later he won another gold at the 1984 World Outdoor Bowls Championships. Following a team gold and double bronze in the triples and fours at the 1988 Auckland Bell won a fourth gold medal in the fours with Andy Thomson, Brett Morley and David Cutler at the 1996 World Outdoor Bowls Championship.

Commonwealth Games
Bell represented England in the fours at the 1994 Commonwealth Games and the fours at the 1998 Commonwealth Games in Kuala Lumpur.

National
Bell made his first appearance in the National Championships at Mortlake in 1966 when he was just 18. He won National Championship titles in the singles in 1983, the triples in 1976 and pairs and triples in 1991. He also won the singles at the British Isles Bowls Championships in 1984.

He bowled for the Wigton Club (outdoors) and the Cumbria Club in Carlisle (indoors). In the mid-1980s he joined the BBC bowls commentary team.

Business career
Bell was the Head of Tourism for Carlisle City Council. He was appointed as the President of World Bowls on 6 December 2012, a position he held until 2021.

References

English male bowls players
1947 births
Living people
Bowls World Champions
Bowls players at the 1994 Commonwealth Games
Bowls players at the 1998 Commonwealth Games
Commonwealth Games competitors for England
Bowls European Champions